Iustin Evdokimovich Dyadkovsky or Justin Dyadkvosky (12 June 1784 – 2 August 1841) was a Russian physician, psychotherapist, rationalist, and natural philosopher. He was a professor at Moscow University and taught materialistic views, rejecting vitalism. He was forced to resign for holding "blasphemous" views in 1836.

Justin was born in the village of Dyatkovo where his father was a priest (sexton) and received his early education at the Ryazan seminary. He studied medicine from 1809 and graduated in 1812. He served in the army during the Patriotic War for two years and joined back as an assistant. His thesis for his doctorate in 1816 was on "Discourse on the effect of drugs on the human body". He became a professor in 1824 and was involved in cholera prevention from 1830. Among his ideas was the classification of diseases as being with or without fever. And among those that did not include fever, he included diseases of the nervous system including psychiatric ailments. He was among the first to explore bibliotherapy, reading as a therapy for certain psychiatric conditions. He was forced to resign from the University in 1836 for supposedly blasphemous views. The specific cause was that he had taught students that under certain conditions, dead bodies do not decompose but mummify, and thus suggested an alternative to miracles ascribed to saints. His beliefs included the idea that the organic world was derived from the inorganic through transformations and special conditions. He saw life as a continuous series of physicochemical processes and held, contrary to vitalist viewpoints, that all the physical and chemical laws continued to be followed in living organisms. He also opposed idealists and claimed that "experience was the sole source of knowledge".

References 

1784 births
1841 deaths
19th-century physicians from the Russian Empire
Academic staff of Moscow State University
People from Dyatkovsky District